The double sovereign is a gold coin of the United Kingdom, with a nominal value of two pounds sterling (£2) or forty shillings.

It was first minted using the design by Benedetto Pistrucci in 1820 under the reign of George III and never entered circulation, instead being considered a pattern coin. As a precursor to the modern £2 coin it shares a similar diameter of 28.4 mm.

History
The history of double sovereigns can be traced back to 1485 when larger sovereign coins were minted using dies of the standard English sovereign, although not entering circulation they are thought to have been for presentation purposes as piedfort coins.

Following the introducing of the new British sovereign coin in 1817, a special proof double sovereign was minted in 1820 however like the previous double sovereign it never entered general circulation. In 1887 for Queen Victoria's Golden Jubilee another double sovereign was issued, this time entering circulation for the first time.

A two pound coin was an occasional feature of the British currency from 1823 until 1996, but has been minted every year since 1997. With the exception of proof coins issued in 1824, 1825, 1826, and 1831, the design of the reverse always featured the George and Dragon of Benedetto Pistrucci, with the year in the exergue under the design.

19th century
The coin was normally issued in cased "proof" condition, although the issues of 1823, 1887, 1893, and 1902 did circulate. The normal weight of the denomination was 16 grams, with a usual diameter of 28 millimetres.

The first appearance of the denomination was in 1820, during the final year of the reign of George III. This rare piece was not struck for circulation but only as a pattern. The obverse shows the bust of the king facing right and wearing a wreath, and bears the legend  [George III by grace of God King of Britain (and) Defender of the Faith]. The reverse has no legend and shows the Pistrucci design.

The coin first appeared as a 'currency' or circulating coin in 1823 during the reign of George IV. The legend on this coin reads .  The date and Pistrucci's George and the Dragon appear on the reverse and  [a decoration and a protection, fourth year of his reign] incised on the edge. The obverse portrait of the king was designed by Jean Baptiste Merlen. This designer is known primarily for his reverses, with the portrait of the 1823 Two Pounds being the only obverse he engraved, using as a basis a model by Sir Francis Chantrey. Apparently, Pistrucci was unwilling to work from the model of another artist. The quality of the strike was exceptional, producing what some consider to be the most beautiful two pound piece ever produced. The reverse of this coin by Pistrucci has been the basis for the design of this denomination right up to the present day (2009 being the most recent).

The 1824-1826 proof coins feature a smaller head of the king, with the legend  and the date, while the reverse shows a crowned shield within a mantle cape with the legend . The 1826 coin has the edge inscription .

In 1831 a proof coin of this denomination was produced for the start of the reign of king William IV. The obverse shows a right-facing head of the king with the legend GULIELMUS IIII D G BRITANNIAR REX F D, while the reverse shows a crowned shield with the legend ANNO 1831. There is no edge inscription. 

The next appearance of the denomination was not until the Golden Jubilee of Queen Victoria in 1887. The Jubilee head was used with the obverse inscription VICTORIA D G BRIT REG F D, while the reverse shows Pistrucci's design of St George slaying the dragon with the only legend being the date in the exergue. The edge of this coin is milled, and it weighs 16 grams. This coin was also (rarely) produced in the mint at Sydney, Australia, which is identified by the letter "S" above the centre of the date.

The Pistrucci reverse was used again in 1893, when the obverse used the "Old Head" of the queen, with the legend VICTORIA DEI GRA BRITT REGINA FID DEF IND IMP, and the edge is again milled.

20th century
In the reign of King Edward VII, £2 coins were issued in 1902 and did circulate. The 1902 Edward VII coin was also minted at Sydney, being identified by an "S" above the centre of the date.

For George V and George VI, £2 coins were only issued in proof sets in the first year of each reign.

In the case of Edward VIII's short reign, it was only prepared for approval, which is why his coin is valued at around £175,000.

All these four reigns used the Pistrucci George and Dragon obverse with milled edges. 

The reign of Queen Elizabeth II saw a departure from the normal practice in issuing gold coinage. A small number of gold £2 pieces were struck in 1953 in order to provide continuity of the series, but the striking was not released to the public, with the result that they are now valued at around  £75,000. No further £2 gold pieces were struck until 1980. Since then they have been issued somewhat haphazardly in most years. Coins from 1980 to 1984 use the Arnold Machin effigy of the Queen, while the 1985-1996 coins use the Raphael Maklouf effigy and most later coins use the Ian Rank-Broadley effigy. Until 1993, all these years use the Pistrucci reverse except for 1986 which used a gold version of the circulating £2 coin, and 1989 when a completely new design was used to commemorate the 500th anniversary of the first issue of the sovereign coin: the obverse shows the Queen seated on the coronation throne holding the orb and sceptre, with the legend ELIZABETH II DEI GRA REG FID DEF, while the reverse shows a crowned shield within a double rose and the legend ANNIVERSARY OF THE GOLD SOVEREIGN 1489-1989.

Double sovereigns continue to be struck by the Royal Mint as bullion coins, with some struck to proof quality for coin collectors, and continue to be legal tender.

In 2017 a limited number of piedforts of the standard-size sovereign were minted to mark the 200th anniversary of the British sovereign coin, with the special Garter obverse design; they had the diameter of a sovereign but the weight and gold content of a double sovereign, due to their double-thickness. Piedforts were again coined in 2018 and 2019, in decreasing mintages.

Circulating £2 coin

Since 1986 circulating £2 coins have been produced in cupronickel, and strikings in gold of some variants of these circulating coins have been struck also, for commemorative purposes/collectors.

See also

 Sovereign (British coin)
 Quintuple sovereign
 Double eagle, U.S. gold coin with face value of $20

References

Bibliography

External links
Coins from United Kingdom / Coin Type: Two Pounds (Pre-Decimal)

British gold coins
Bullion coins
Saint George and the Dragon